Samsung Lions Ballpark is a stadium in Gyeongsan, North Gyeongsang Province, South Korea. The ballpark serves as the training ground for the Samsung Lions.

Baseball venues in South Korea
Sports venues in North Gyeongsang Province
Samsung Lions
Samsung Sports
Sports venues completed in 1990